Ponta may refer to:
Ponta, Portuguese for "point" or promontory, is a part of many Portuguese and Brazilian toponyms:

 Ponta, Texas
 Ponta Grossa, a city in Brazil
 Ponta Pelada Airport, an airport in Brazil
 Ponta Porã International Airport, the airport serving Ponta Porã, Brazil
 Ponta Porã, a municipality in Brazil
 Victor Ponta (born 1972), Romanian politician

See also 
 Ponta Cabinet (disambiguation)
 Ponta Delgada (disambiguation)
 Punta (disambiguation)
 - includes many geographical locations